Crayons and Paper is a documentary short, featuring Dr. Jerry Ehrlich, a pediatrician who has worked with Doctors Without Borders. To document the effect of war on children, Dr. Ehrlich has the children draw pictures of their lives. The film features drawings made by children in Sri Lanka and Darfur.

The film is a follow-up to the documentary Facing Sudan.  It premiered at The Dam Short Film Festival in February 2009 and was broadcast on DOC: The Documentary Channel until it changed formats.

The film was produced, directed and edited by Bruce David Janu.  The soundtrack was composed by Tom Flannery and Lorne Clarke (singer).

References
 Callahan, Kevin, "A Gift to us at Noon on this Christmas Day," The Currier-Post Online, December 25, 2008.
 DeCastro, Lavinia, "Film Depicts Horrors Kids Live Through in Darfur," The Courier-Post of South New Jersey, June 28, 2009
 "Got Docs?" Segment from GRITtv with Laura Flanders, featuring Crayons and Paper, first aired July 24, 2008

External links
 
 
 Crayons and Paper at the Documentary Channel

2009 films
American short documentary films
Documentary films about human rights
Documentary films about the War in Darfur
Documentary films about the Sri Lankan Civil War
Documentary films about children in war
Children's arts organizations
2009 short documentary films
Art therapy
2000s English-language films
2000s American films